This list of museums in Herefordshire, England contains museums which are defined for this context as institutions (including nonprofit organizations, government entities, and private businesses) that collect and care for objects of cultural, artistic, scientific, or historical interest and make their collections or related exhibits available for public viewing. Also included are non-profit art galleries and university art galleries.  Museums that exist only in cyberspace (i.e., virtual museums) are not included.

Defunct museums
 Churchill House Museum, Hereford

See also
 :Category:Tourist attractions in Herefordshire

References
Notes

Sources
Visit Britain: Herefordshire Museums
Visit Herefordshire

 
Herefordshire
Museums